Aspergillus fischerianus is a BSL-1 plant pathogen, mostly found in canned foods.

References

External links
USDA ARS Fungal Database

Fungal plant pathogens and diseases
fischerianus